The Sapa Inca (from Quechua Sapa Inka "the only emperor") was the monarch of the Inca Empire (Tawantinsuyu), as well as ruler of the earlier Kingdom of Cusco and the later Neo-Inca State. While the origins of the position are mythical and originate from the legendary foundation of the city of Cusco, it seems to have come into being historically around 1100 CE. Although the Inca believed the Sapa to be the son of Inti (the Inca Sun god) and often referred to him as Intip Churin or ‘Son of the Sun,’ the position eventually became hereditary, with son succeeding father. The principal wife of the Inca was known as the Coya or Qoya. The Sapa Inca was at the top of the social hierarchy, and played a dominant role in the political and spiritual realm.

There were two known dynasties, led by the Hurin and Hanan moieties respectively. The latter was in power at the time of Spanish conquest. The last effective Sapa Inca of Inca Empire was Atahualpa, who was executed by Francisco Pizarro and his conquistadors in 1533, but several successors later claimed the title.

Other terms for Sapa Inca, also spelled Sapan Inca, include Apu ("divinity"), Inka Qhapaq ("mighty Inca"), or simply Sapa ("the only one").

Choosing the Inca 
Chronicles identify the Inca as the highest ruler equivalent to European kings of the Middle Ages. However, the original access to that position was not linked to the inheritance of the eldest son, as is for a monarchy, but to the perceived selection of the gods by means of rigorous challenges, to which the physical and moral aptitudes of the pretender were tested. These trials were accompanied by a complex spiritual ritual through which the Sun god, Inti nominated the one who should assume the Inca position. Eventually, with the passage of time, Incas named their favorite son as co-governor with the intention of securing his succession, for example, Huiracocha Inca associated Inca Urco to the throne. The Coya, or Sapa Inca's primary wife, had significant influence upon making this decision of which son is apt to succeed his father.

Functions 
The Sapa Inca was the absolute ruler of the empire and accumulated in his power the political, social, military, and economic direction of the State. He ordered and directed the construction of great engineering works, such as Sacsayhuaman, a fortress that took 50 years to complete; or the urban plan of the cities. However, among their most notable works, was the network of roads that crossed the entire empire and allowed a rapid journey for the administrators, messengers, and armies provided with hanging bridges and tambos. They made sure to always be supplied and well cared for, as is reflected in the construction of storehouses scattered throughout the empire and vast food and resource redistribution systems. The commander and chief of the standing army founded military colonies to expand the culture and control, while simultaneously ensuring the preservation of that network.

At the religious level, they were symbolic of the sun and promoted the worship of Inti, regarded as their father, and organized the calendar. At the political level, they sent inspectors to oversee the loyalty and efficiency of civil servants and collect tribute from the subjugated peoples. The emperors promoted a unified and decentralized government in which Cuzco acted as the articulating axis of the different regions or Suyu. They appointed highly trusted governors. At the economic level, they decided how much each province should pay according to its resources. They knew how to win over the curacas to ensure control of the communities. These were the intermediaries through whom they collected taxes.

Traditionally, every time an emperor died or resigned, his successor was disinherited from his father's inheritance and formed his own lineage royal clan or Panaka, his father's lands, houses and servants were passed to his other children remaining on the previous Panaka. The new Sapa Inca had to obtain land and spoils to bequeath to his own descendants. Each time they subdued a people, they demanded that the defeated leader surrender part of their land to continue in command, and whose people pay tribute in the form of labor (mita) taxes.

The Sapa Inca also played a major role in caring for the poor and hungry, hence his other title Huaccha Khoyaq or ‘Lover and Benefactor of the Poor’. The Sapa was responsible for organizing food redistribution in times of environmental disaster, allocated work via state-sponsored projects, and most notably promoted major state-sponsored religious feasts that followed each successful harvest season.

Distinction symbols 
The Inca was divinized, both in their actions and their emblems. In public he carried the topayauri (scepter), ushno (golden throne), suntur páucar (feathered pike), and the mascaipacha (royal insignia) commonly carried in a llauto (headband), otherwise, the mascapaicha could also be carried on an amachana chuku (military helmet). In religious ceremonies he was accompanied by the sacred white flame, the napa, covered with a red blanket and adorned with gold earrings. With textiles representing a form of status and wealth, it has been speculated that the Sapa Inca never wore the same clothes twice. The community even revered the Sapa after his death, mummifying him and frequently visiting his tomb to "consult" him on pressing affairs.

Pre-Conquest Sapa Incas

First dynasty
Little is known of the rulers of the first dynasty of Sapa Incas. Evidently, they were affiliated with the Hurin moiety and their rule did not extend beyond the Kingdom of Cusco. Their origins are tied to the mythical establishment of Cusco and are shrouded in the later foundation myth. The dynasty was supposedly founded by Manco Cápac, considered the son of the Sun god Inti.

As a rough guide to the later reputation of the early Sapa Incas, in later years capac meant warlord and sinchi meant leader.

Second dynasty
The second dynasty was affiliated with the Hanan moiety and was founded under Inca Roca, the son of the last Hurin Sapa Inca, Cápac Yupanqui. After Cápac Yupanqui's death, another of his sons, Inca Roca's half-brother Quispe Yupanqui, was intended to succeed him. However, the Hanan revolted and installed Inca Roca instead.

Ninan Cuyochi, who was Inca for only a few days in 1527, is sometimes left off the list of Sapa Incas because news of his death from smallpox arrived in Cusco very shortly after he was declared Sapa Inca. He had witnessed the death of his father Huayna Cápac. The death of Ninan, the presumed heir, led to the Inca Civil War between Huáscar and Atahualpa, a weakness that the Spanish exploited when they conquered the Inca Empire.

Post-Conquest Sapa Incas

This last Sapa Inca must not be confused with Túpac Amaru II, who was leader of an 18th-century Peruvian uprising.

Family tree

See also

Muisca Confederation
Inca Empire

References

Deified people
Heads of state
 
Royal titles
Former monarchies of South America
South American monarchs
12th-century establishments in the Inca civilization
16th-century disestablishments in the Inca civilization
Former countries in South America